is a type of tataki, a manner of preparing fish or meat finely minced and mixed with some spices and seasonings, not unlike a tartare.

This recipe has been passed down among Bōsō Peninsula fishermen.

References 

Cooking techniques
Japanese cuisine
Uncooked fish dishes